It's Forever Springtime (Italian: È primavera...) is a 1950 Italian drama film directed by Renato Castellani.

Plot 
Beppe Agosti, Florentine, baker's boy and orphan, is very popular with girls, especially the servants, for his easy way of doing things and for his cheerfulness. Called up to arms, he is sent to Catania and becomes friends with Cavalluccio, a Sicilian fellow soldier and acts as a companion for his engagement with Maria Antonia, a waitress in the house of a well-known lawyer. Cavalluccio, for a serious lack of discipline, is put in prison and transferred. Maria Antonia is sad and Beppe knows how to console her so the two fall in love and then get married. Beppe is also transferred to Milan, where he feels alone and ends up marrying himself with the new conqueror Lucia, not revealing that he is already married. But Maria Antonia learns that her husband's class has been dismissed, and she becomes suspicious of her, so she runs to Milan where she, having discovered everything about her, she tries to kill him, but her knife falls from her hand. All this is followed by legal proceedings, with the logical solution that the second marriage is not valid. Beppe and Maria Antonia, happy, return to Catania.

Cast
 Mario Angelotti as Beppe Agosti
 Elena Varzi as Maria Antonia
 Don Donati as Cavalluccio
 Ettore Jannetti as Avvocato Di Salvo
 Grazia Idonea as Signora Di Salvo
 Irene Genna as Lucia
 Gianni Santi
 Tanino Chiurazzi as Il ragazzo
 Cesare Ranucci as Il presidente
 Ernesto Gaione as Avvocato Rossi
 Giordano Gaggioli as Il fornaio
 Ugo Gigliarelli as Il cappellano
 Amedeo Orsini
 Giovanna Roscioli
 Renato Baldini

References

External links
 

1950 films
1950 drama films
Films scored by Nino Rota
1950s Italian-language films
Films directed by Renato Castellani
Films with screenplays by Suso Cecchi d'Amico
Italian drama films
Italian black-and-white films
1950s Italian films